Richard Carl "Rich" Ackerman (born June 16, 1959, in La Grange, Illinois) is a former American football defensive tackle in the National Football League. He played for the San Diego Chargers and Los Angeles Raiders, and attended Glenbard North High School. He had a career total 18 starts, 14 with the San Diego Chargers.

Ackerman is a guitar player and singer.  He performs at various venues all over Wyoming. He has two children.

References

1959 births
Living people
Sportspeople from La Grange, Illinois
Players of American football from Illinois
American football defensive tackles
Memphis Tigers football players
San Diego Chargers players
Los Angeles Raiders players
National Football League replacement players